Fuat Usta (born 3 July 1972) is a Turkish football coach and former professional player.

Playing career
Usta played as a midfielder in the Netherlands, Turkey, Finland, and Japan with Rapid, MVV'02, Fortuna Sittard, Beşiktaş, Cambuur, Sparta, Jokerit, MVV and Omiya Ardija.

Usta left MVV in August 2002 to sign with Japanese club Omiya Ardija until the end of the 2002 season. He returned to MVV in January 2003, on an amateur contract.

Coaching career
After three years working as an assistant manager of Fortuna Sittard, in July 2010 he was appointed by Guus Hiddink to be an assistant coach of the Turkish national team. He was also responsible for the U23 team. In October 2012 he moved with Hiddink to Russian club Anzhi Makhachkala, where he became head of youth education. He left Anzhi in 2017.

In the 2016–17 season, Usta did an internship at MVV Maastricht to complete his UEFA Pro course at the KNVB in May 2018. In the 2017–18 season, he worked as assistant manager for the club. Ahead of the 2019–20 season signed a one-year contract as the club's new manager. His contract was not renewed for the 2020–21 season.

References

External links
 

1972 births
Living people
Sportspeople from Samsun
Turkish footballers
Association football midfielders
Eredivisie players
Eerste Divisie players
Süper Lig players
Veikkausliiga players
J2 League players
Fortuna Sittard players
Beşiktaş J.K. footballers
SC Cambuur players
Sparta Rotterdam players
FC Jokerit players
MVV Maastricht players
Omiya Ardija players
Turkish football managers
Eerste Divisie managers
MVV Maastricht managers
Turkish expatriate footballers
Turkish expatriate football managers
Turkish expatriate sportspeople in the Netherlands
Expatriate footballers in the Netherlands
Expatriate football managers in the Netherlands
Turkish expatriate sportspeople in Finland
Expatriate footballers in Finland
Turkish expatriate sportspeople in Japan
Expatriate footballers in Japan
Turkish expatriate sportspeople in Russia
Fortuna Sittard non-playing staff
MVV Maastricht non-playing staff